Smolinskaya Vystavka is a rural locality (a village) in Parfyonovskoye Rural Settlement, Velikoustyugsky District, Vologda Oblast, Russia. The population was 29 as of 2002.

Geography 
Smolinskaya Vystavka is located 30 km southeast of Veliky Ustyug (the district's administrative centre) by road. Novoye Rozhkovo is the nearest rural locality.

References 

Rural localities in Velikoustyugsky District